Sergio Sánchez may refer to:
Sergio Hugo Sánchez Ballivián (born 1950), Bolivian ambassador
Sergio Sánchez Hernández (born 1968), Spanish paralympic athlete
Sergio Sánchez (sport shooter) (born 1970), Guatemalan Olympic sport shooter
Sergio G. Sánchez (born 1973), Spanish director and screenwriter
Sergio Sánchez (footballer, born 1977), former Spanish football goalkeeper
Sergio Sánchez (runner) (born 1982), Spanish long-distance runner
Sergio Sánchez (footballer, born 1986), Spanish football defender
Sergio Sánchez (footballer, born 1995), Spanish football forward

See also:
Sergio S. Morán (born 1984), Spanish webcartoonist born Sergio Sánchez Morán